Stittsville Transitway Station is a bus-stop on Ottawa, Ontario's transitway served by OC Transpo buses. It located on Shea Road at the Goulbourn Recreation Complex in Stittsville, Ontario.

It is the western terminus of some route 61 trips. A park and ride facility is also located in Stittsville but it is not served by the 61 (only express route 262 runs by the facility near Carp Road and Highway 417).  Service on route 61 to/from this station generally operates every 30 minutes during all time periods, except 15 minute peak service on route 61C (eastbound in the morning and westbound in the afternoon) and hourly frequencies on weekend evenings.

Service on route 61 and route 61C have been shortened to start/end at the Goulbourn Recreation Complex on Shea Road. Route 62 provides service on Granite Ridge Drive, previously served by route 61 and 61C.

As of 28 June 2015, route 96A trips were replaced by route 92 (now route 62). Route 62 operates on Campeau Drive between Kanata Avenue and Eagleson Road, replacing local route 164. At the same time, both route 61 and route 62 were shortened to start/end at St-Laurent Station, as the eastern leg of the Transitway is being converted to LRT for the Confederation Line by 2018. Service on route 62 otherwise is the same as route 96A within Kanata and Stittsville. Route 62 only services Stittsville during weekday peak periods and weekday midday at 30 minute headway (as was the case with route 96A).

Service

The following routes serve Stittsville station as of October 6 2019:

References

See also
 Stittsville, Ontario
 Kanata, Ontario
 Ottawa Rapid Transit
 OC Transpo

Transitway (Ottawa) stations